Maledictology (from Latin maledicere, "to say [something] (dicere) bad (male)" and Greek logia, "study of") is a branch of psychology that does research into cursing and swearing. It is influenced by American psychologist Timothy Jay (Massachusetts College of Liberal Arts) and the philologist and researcher in swearwords  Reinhold Aman (California).  They assume that swearing is part of human life and can even act as a passive self-defense, since it prevents palpable argument.

Literature
 Jay, Timothy: Why We Curse. A Neuro-Psycho-Social Theory of Speech. John Benjamins Publishing, 2000, 
 Aman, Reinhold: Opus Maledictorum. A Book of Bad Words. Marlowe & Co, 1996, 
 Aman, Reinhold: Bayrisch-Österreichisches Schimpfwörterbuch. Allitera Verlag, 2005,   
 Aman, Reinhold: Maledicta: The International Journal of Verbal Aggression (1977--). 
 Grassi, Natascia: La Traduzione degli Insulti nel Doppiaggio di Film Americani / The Translation of Insults into Italian Dubbing Language of American Movies. Tesi  di Laurea, Università di Bologna, Anno Accademico 2002–2003.

External links
 Article of "Berliner Morgenpost"
 InsultWiki (public domain insult directory)

Psycholinguistics